Norman Cowie is a video artist and writer in Los Angeles.

Some of his productions include: Signal to Noise: Life with Television (Co-Director; 1996), The Third Wave, Miss Menu's Interactive World, Poison Ivy (1995), Mr. Rogers Goes Begging the Question!!!, It's a Proud Day for America, About Face (1991), Lying in State (1989), and Nazareth in August (1986).

Ranging from collaborative documentaries to video art, Cowie's work interrogates the relations of power and domination in contemporary society, and seeks to problematize the ways in which meaning and consent are constructed through the media. Cowie's videotapes often use the techniques of documentary, off-air appropriation, and short form sound and text collage. Currently a video producer and a professor teaching media theory and production, Cowie has been drawn toward media literacy as an activist and pedagogical tool.

External links
 Official Norman Cowie website
 
 Norman Cowie in the Video Data Bank

Year of birth missing (living people)
American video artists
Living people
Artists from Los Angeles